Steve Bernard (born 28 December 1949) is an Australian cricketer and referee. He played his Domestic matches for New South Wales. Bernard serves as a member of the ICC Associate and Affiliate Panel of Referee representing Australia.

See also
 List of New South Wales representative cricketers

References

1949 births
Living people
Australian cricketers
New South Wales cricketers
Australia national cricket team selectors